Radiobrás was a public Brazilian radio and television company.  Radiobrás became incorporated into Empresa Brasil de Comunicação.

References

Mass media companies established in 1975
Mass media companies disestablished in 2008
Empresa Brasil de Comunicação